Mickaël Bethe-Selassié (15 February 1951 – 5 December 2020) was an Ethiopian sculptor known for his work in papier mâché.  He left Ethiopia after graduating from high school in 1970, studying science in college.  He turned to sculpture at the age of 30, and lived and worked in Paris.  Some of his works can be found in the collection of the National Museum of African Art in Washington, DC.

He died from natural causes on December 5, 2020.

References

External links
Biographical sketch
Official website

1951 births
2020 deaths
Ethiopian sculptors
Ethiopian expatriates in France
20th-century sculptors
21st-century sculptors